The Shaheed Vijay Singh Pathik Sports Complex or Greater Noida Sports Complex Ground is a cricket and association football stadium in Greater Noida, India, and it was the home ground of the Afghanistan national cricket team. In 2017, it lost its status to hold any Board of Control for Cricket in India (BCCI) conducted matches after staging a private league which was not permitted by BCCI.

The stadium is named after Vijay Singh Pathik, an Indian revolutionary who fought against British rule. The stadium conforms to norms and specifications prescribed by International Cricket Council (ICC) with associated amenities like media and corporate boxes, medical facilities, merchandise stores, a food court, an information kiosk and many others. In December 2016, the ICC gave approval for the ground to host international matches between Full Member teams.

History

Uttar Pradesh Cricket Association secretary Rajeev Shukla in November 2009 said the Jaypee Group, who are developing a Sports city in Greater Noida are building a cricket stadium there and UPCA has already inked a fifty-year agreement with them to hold matches. At that time, he added that stadium will be ready by 2011 and it will hold Twenty20 and One-Day International matches. Initially the spectator capacity at the stadium will be 40,000 but it will be increased to 100,000.

The stadium had discussions with ICC to give it a status for holding Tests and One Day International matches. Previously, the stadium qualified for holding all matches except Tests and ODIs, but later confirmed to host any international match.

It is also the home ground of the Afghanistan cricket team. However, the seating capacity of the stadium is currently 8,000 with no current plans to upgrade it to what was initially planned.

Shukla said they were ready to take Green Park Stadium on lease from the state government but they have not been successful in convincing the authorities. He said they were looking for a land between Kanpur and Lucknow to have their own stadium.

It is built as per the latest ICC specifications and guidelines, and is named Shaheed Vijay Singh Pathik Sports Complex. The stadium is fully equipped with all the facilities with floodlights, a bowling alley, an indoor stadium, lawn tennis courts in the premises. The stadium is located near YMCA and Jaypee Resorts in Greater Noida. The stadium hosted its first ever Ranji Trophy match between Uttar Pradesh cricket team and Baroda cricket team from 1 to 4 December 2015.

Greater Noida has hosted the 2016 Duleep Trophy matches. All the matches were played with pink ball under lights.

Home ground for Afghanistan
The stadium became the home ground for the Afghanistan cricket team after they decided to shift their home ground from Sharjah. The stadium hosted 2015–17 ICC Intercontinental Cup match between Afghanistan cricket team and Namibia cricket team in April 2016 as Afghanistan beat Namibia by an innings and 36 runs.

On 25 July 2016, it was announced that Afghanistan will host a full  series against Ireland at this stadium. Besides a 4-day Intercontinental cup match, Ireland and Afghanistan played 5 ODIs and 3 T20Is in March 2017. Afghanistan won both T20I series 3–0, and ODI series 3-2.

International Centuries
The following table summaries the centuries scored at Greater Noida Sports Complex Ground, Greater Noida.

ODIs

List of Five Wicket Hauls

ODIs

T20Is

See also
 Greater Noida
 2016–17 Duleep Trophy

References

External links
UP to get one more cricket stadium by 2011
 cricinfo
 cricketarchive

Cricket grounds in Uttar Pradesh
Sports venues in Noida
Jaypee Group
Sports venues completed in 2013
2014 establishments in Bihar